Geneva Carr (born May 6, 1971) is an American television and stage actress with an extensive acting résumé. She is best known for her portrayal of Marissa Morgan on the CBS television series Bull and for her performance as Margery in the original Broadway cast of Hand to God, earning a nomination for the Tony Award for Best Actress in a Play.

Early life and career
Carr was born in Jackson, Mississippi, to George and Phyllis (née Duba) Carr. She has two brothers, George Carr II and Joseph Carr.

Carr studied French at Mount Holyoke College and initially had a career in banking before deciding to become an actress. She studied French in Paris and earned her MBA in Business from ESCP. She studied acting with Jane Hoffman at the Actors Studio. To support herself while she honed her craft and auditioned for parts, Carr waited on tables, bartended, and did gigs as a voice actress.

She played "Mom" on the AT&T commercials where she fretted over lost "rollover" minutes, and her big break was in the Broadway play Hand to God in 2015.

Filmography

Film

Television

Video games

References

External links
 
 
 Personal website with complete filmography
 New York Times Filmography
 Photographs at Broadway World
 Photographs at MyCeleb

1971 births
American television actresses
Living people
American stage actresses
American video game actresses
Actresses from Mississippi
Actors from Jackson, Mississippi
21st-century American actresses
20th-century American actresses
Theatre World Award winners
Mount Holyoke College alumni